This is a list of places in Palestine which have standing links to local communities in other countries known as "town twinning" (usually in Europe) or "sister cities" (usually in the rest of the world).

B
Beit Jala

 Aubervilliers, France
 Bergisch Gladbach, Germany
 La Calera, Chile
 Jena, Germany
 Pitești, Romania
 Reggio Emilia, Italy 
 Santa María del Mar, Peru
 Varazze, Italy

Beit Sahour

 Agliana, Italy
 Aulnoye-Aymeries, France
 Doha, Qatar
 Opsterland, Netherlands
 Tralee, Ireland
 Utena, Lithuania
 Xanten, Germany

Bethlehem

 Abu Dhabi, United Arab Emirates
 Arad, Romania
 Assisi, Italy
 Athens, Greece
 Barranquilla, Colombia
 Brescia, Italy
 Budapest, Hungary
 Burlington, United States
 Capri, Italy
 Castelnuovo di Porto, Italy
 Catanzaro, Italy
 Chartres, France
 Chivasso, Italy
 La Cisterna, Chile
 Civitavecchia, Italy
 Cologne, Germany
 Concepción, Chile
 Las Condes, Chile
 Cori, Italy
 Cortale, Italy
 Creil, France
 Curinga, Italy
 Cusco, Peru
 Częstochowa, Poland
 Dakhla, Western Sahara
 Este, Italy
 Faggiano, Italy
 Florence, Italy
 Gallipoli, Italy
 Għajnsielem, Malta
 Glasgow, Scotland, United Kingdom
 Greccio, Italy
 Grenoble, France
 Grottaferrata, Italy
 Jacurso, Italy
 Joplin, United States
 Kalocsa, Hungary
 Lazio, Italy
 Lourdes, France
 Maida, Italy
 Marrickville (Inner West), Australia
 Milan, Italy
 Monterrey, Mexico
 Montesarchio, Italy
 Montevarchi, Italy
 Montpellier, France
 Natal, Brazil
 Orvieto, Italy
 Otranto, Italy
 Palermo, Italy
 Pavia, Italy
 Pietrelcina, Italy
 Pratovecchio Stia, Italy
 Rabat, Morocco
 Sacramento, United States
 Saint Petersburg, Russia
 San Miniato, Italy
 San Pietro a Maida, Italy
 Sant'Anastasia, Italy
 Sarpsborg, Norway
 Steyr, Austria
 Suceava, Romania
 Třebechovice pod Orebem, Czech Republic
 Verbania, Italy
 Vicenza, Italy
 Villa Alemana, Chile
 Vladimir, Russia
 Zaragoza, Spain

Al-Bireh
 Gennevilliers, France

E
East Jerusalem

 Cairo, Egypt
 Fez, Morocco
 Jakarta, Indonesia
 Nouakchott, Mauritania
 Oujda, Morocco
 Tehran, Iran

G
Gaza City

 Agadir, Morocco
 Barcelona, Spain
 Brasília, Brazil
 Cascais, Portugal
 Dubai, United Arab Emirates
 Dunkirk, France
 Gediz, Turkey
 Keçiören, Turkey
 Meram, Turkey
 Moyle, Northern Ireland, United Kingdom
 Osmangazi, Turkey
 Sidon, Lebanon
 Tabriz, Iran
 Tromsø, Norway
 Turin, Italy
 Yıldırım, Turkey

H
Halhul
 Hennebont, France

Hebron

 Amman, Jordan
 Beyoğlu, Turkey
 Bursa, Turkey
 Keçiören, Turkey
 Medina, Saudi Arabia
 Saint-Pierre-des-Corps, France
 Şanlıurfa, Turkey
 Yiwu, China

J
Jabalia

 Tiguent, Mauritania
 Ümraniye, Turkey

Jericho

 Alessandria, Italy
 Campinas, Brazil
 Eger, Hungary
 Estación Central, Chile
 Fez, Morocco
 Foz do Iguaçu, Brazil
 Iași, Romania
 Ilion, Greece
 Kragujevac, Serbia
 Lærdal, Norway
 San Giovanni Valdarno, Italy
 Santa Bárbara, Brazil
 Al-Shuna al-Shamalyah, Jordan

K
Khan Yunis

 Bisceglie, Italy
 El-Gadarif, Sudan
 Hamar, Norway
 Palermo, Italy
 Tétouan, Morocco

N
Nablus

 Boulder, United States
 Chalandri, Greece
 Como, Italy

 Dundee, Scotland, United Kingdom

 Khasavyurt, Russia
 Lille, France
 Naples, Italy
 Nazareth, Israel
 Poznań, Poland
 Rabat, Morocco
 Stavanger, Norway
 Tuscany, Italy

R
Rafah

 Olympia, United States
 Pesaro, Italy
 Sancaktepe, Turkey

Ramallah

 Bordeaux, France
 Hounslow, England, United Kingdom
 Johannesburg, South Africa
 Liège, Belgium
 Muscatine, United States
 Oxford, England, United Kingdom
 Sur, Turkey
 Trondheim, Norway

Z
Zababdeh
 Ixelles, Belgium

References

Palestine
Palestine (region)-related lists
State of Palestine geography-related lists
Cities in the State of Palestine
Populated places in the State of Palestine